Department of Agriculture, Fisheries and Forestry may refer to:
 Department of Agriculture, Fisheries and Forestry (Australia)
 Department of Agriculture, Fisheries and Forestry (Queensland)
 Department of Agriculture, Fisheries and Forestry (Isle of Man)

See also 
 Department of Agriculture, Forestry and Fisheries (South Africa)
 List of agriculture ministries
 List of forestry ministries
 Ministry of Agriculture, Forestry and Fisheries (disambiguation)